The 1998 Belmont Stakes was the 130th running of the Belmont Stakes and the 94th time that the event took place at Belmont Park in Elmont, New York.

Victory Gallop, ridden by jockey Gary Stevens and trained by W. Elliott Walden won the race by a nose over favorite Real Quiet. Victory Gallop's win prevented Real Quiet from winning the Triple Crown that year.

Full results 

 Winning Breeder: Tall Oaks Farm (Ivan Dalos) (ON)

References

External links 
 1998 Belmont Stakes Results 

Belmont Stakes races
Belmont Stakes
Belmont Stakes
Belmont Stakes
Belmont Stakes